The North Macedonia women's national football team represents North Macedonia in international women's football. The team is controlled by the Football Federation of Macedonia, the governing body for football in the country.

History

They are currently coached by Kiril Izov. The North Macedonia women's team find themselves ranked 129th out of 159 active women's footballing nations registered with FIFA.

The women's team played their first official game on 7 May 2005, in which they were beaten 4–0 by Croatia. Two weeks later, on 21 May 2005, Macedonia scored their first ever goal in a 7–1 loss to Slovenia.

Team image

Nicknames
The North Macedonia women's national football team has been known or nicknamed as the "Црвени Лавови (The Red Lions)" or "Црвено-Жолти (Red-Yellows)".

Home stadium
The North Macedonia plays their home matches on the Toše Proeski Arena in Skopje, but they also use Petar Miloševski Training Centre as an alternative stadium. In the past, they also played some of the matches on Gradski Stadium in Kumanovo, Goce Delčev Stadium in Prilep and stadiums Blagoj Istatov and Kukuš in Strumica.

Results and fixtures

The following is a list of match results in the last 12 months, as well as any future matches that have been scheduled.

Legend

2022

2023

Coaching staff

Current coaching staff

As of November 2020

Manager history

 Dobre Dimovski (?–2012)
 Toshe Nacev and Blagoja Filipovski (interim) (2012)
 Gorazd Mihajlov (2012–2013)
 Dobre Dimovski (2013–2014)
 Vancho Balevski (2014–2016)
 Kiril Izov (2016–)

Players

Current squad
 The following players were called up for a friendly match against Montenegro on 21 February 2021.
 Caps and goals updated after the match against Kazakhstan on 27 November 2020.

Recent call ups
 The following players have been called up to the North Macedonia squad in the past 12 months.

Records

 Active players in bold, statistics correct as of 2020.

Most capped players

Top goalscorers

Scorers by year

Competitive record

FIFA Women's World Cup

*Draws include knockout matches decided on penalty kicks.

Olympic Games

UEFA Women's Championship

*Draws include knockout matches decided on penalty kicks.

References

External links
 Official website
 FIFA profile

 
European women's national association football teams